Algis Kizys (born September 8, 1960 in Chicago) is a New York City bass guitarist most well known for his long-time membership in New York City band Swans.  First joining Swans on 1986's Greed LP, he stayed with the group through The Great Annihilator (1995).  He is also a founding member Of Cabbages and Kings, an offshoot of Bag People.

Biography
Of Cabbages and Kings featured Kizys, founder/guitarist/keyboardist/vocalist/producer Carolyn Master, Roy Mayorga (Nausea, Soulfly, Stone Sour), Vinnie Signorelli (Unsane), Ted Parsons (Prong, Swans, Godflesh, Jesu, Teledubgnosis) and Diane Wlezein. Kizys, Master, and Wlezein previously played in Bag People.

Kizys has spent time in Foetus' live incarnation and played for Glenn Branca in his Symphony No. 6.

Kizys was a member of Problem Dogs, his first band formed with Rick Radtke, John Connors, and Demetra Plakas (who later played drums with L7).

During this time, August 1982, he briefly joined forces with guitarist Edward "Phast Eddie" Lines, Connors and Plakas as Phlegm Magnets, which played several shows at the Space Place in Chicago.

From 1994 -1997 Algis Kizys created a band with singer songwriter Soraya Rashid called "Soraya".  Other members included Norman Westberg (ex Swans), Ted Parsons (Prong), Vinnie Signorelli (Swans, Unsane), Eric Hubel (Glenn Branca), and J. G. Thirlwell (Foetus)

Kizys with Jonathan Bepler and David Thorpe composed "Firmament" for Nerve magazine's "Sweet & Vicious" audio book.  Firmament served as a soundscape to the JT Leroy story, "Natoma Street", performed by Callie Thorne. Gus Van Sant used "Firmament" for the pivotal scene in his film, "Finding Forrester", starring Sean Connery.

Kizys's current band, NeVAh, features Vinnie Signorelli from Unsane and Norman Westberg from Swans.  NeVAh are currently playing in what's left of New York's underground scene.

Discography

Swans

Of Cabbages and Kings

Other appearances

References

External links

1960 births
Living people
American rock bass guitarists
American male bass guitarists
American indie rock musicians
Of Cabbages and Kings members
Pigface members
Swans (band) members
American punk rock bass guitarists
American post-punk musicians
American industrial musicians
Noise rock musicians
American people of Lithuanian descent
Guitarists from Chicago
Guitarists from New York City
American male guitarists
20th-century American guitarists